Constantine I, also known as Constantine Khan (კონსტანტინე ხანი), Constantin(e) Mirza, or Konstandil / Kustandil Mirza (1567 – October 22, 1605), of the Bagrationi Dynasty, was a king of Kakheti in eastern Georgia from March to October 1605.

Biography
A son of King Alexander II of Kakheti by his wife Tinatin née Amilakhvari, Constantine was taken in his childhood to Persia where he was converted to Islam, brought up at the court, and lived for many years. When envoys from his father Alexander II, Simon I of Kartli, and Manuchir II of Samtskhe arrived at the Safavid court between 1596 and 1597 with many gifts, including slave boys and girls, Constantine  entertained them. He served as a darugha (prefect) of the royal city of Qazvin and then of Isfahan (1602–1603). In 1604, Shah Abbas I of Persia appointed him as the governor and commander of Shirvan to fight the Ottoman forces there, and ordered him to secure the Kakhetian participation in the campaign. As Alexander II was reluctant to engage in this conflict, Constantine, accompanied by a sizable Persian entourage, arrived in Kakheti, being honorably met by his father and elder brother George at a camp near the town of Zagem (Bazari). 

On March 12, 1605, during the negotiations, Constantine murdered Alexander and George, and declared himself King of Kakheti. However, his subjects refused to recognize a patricide and revolted. The rebellion was led by Ketevan, widow of Constantine’s brother David I, who requested aid from his relative King George X of Kartli. Constantine succeeded in bribing some of the rebel nobles, and, on the shah’s order, led a combined Kakhetian-Qizilbash army against Shirvan. During the protracted siege of Shemakha, the Kakhetian auxiliaries revolted and made Constantine flee. The rebels sent emissaries to Shah Abbas and pledged loyalty provided that Abbas confirmed their candidate, Ketevan’s son Teimuraz, as a Christian king of Kakheti. Meanwhile, the Kartlian forces under Prince Papuna Amilakhvari intervened and inflicted a decisive defeat on Constantine’s army on October 22, 1605. Constantine was killed in battle, and Abbas was forced to acknowledge Teimuraz as a king.

According to the recently discovered chronicle by Fażli Ḵuzāni, a contemporary Persian official and historian, Constantine married, c. 1604, his own niece, a daughter of Mohammed Khan, an influential Qizilbash chieftain, who was married to a daughter of Alexander II. Mohammed Khan's son, Bektash (who was therefore Constantine's brother-in-law and cousin at the same time), accompanied Constantine to Kakheti and later became the province's ruler until being overthrown in a rebellion led by Davit Jandieri in 1615.

See also  
 Iranian Georgians

Ancestry

References

Sources

  
 
 
 

1567 births
1605 deaths
Bagrationi dynasty of the Kingdom of Kakheti
Safavid appointed kings of Kakheti
Safavid governors of Shirvan
Converts to Shia Islam from Eastern Orthodoxy
Former Georgian Orthodox Christians
Iranian people of Georgian descent
People from Qazvin
Safavid prefects of Qazvin
Safavid prefects of Isfahan
Safavid generals
Patricides
Regicides
16th-century people of Safavid Iran
17th-century people of Safavid Iran